The 2020–21 FIS Snowboard World Cup was the 28th World Cup season in snowboarding organised by International Ski Federation. The season started on 23 October 2021 and concluded on 27 March 2022. Competitions consisted of parallel slalom, parallel giant slalom, snowboard cross, halfpipe, slopestyle and big air.

On 1 March 2022, following the 2022 Russian invasion of Ukraine, FIS decided to exclude athletes from Russia and Belarus from FIS competitions, with an immediate effect.

Men

Snowboard Cross

Parallel

Halfpipe

Slopestyle

Big Air

Women

Snowboard Cross

Parallel

Halfpipe

Slopestyle

Big Air

Team

Parallel mixed

Snowboard cross team mixed

Men's standings

Parallel overall (PSL/PGS)

Parallel slalom

Parallel giant slalom

Snowboard Cross

Freestyle overall (BA/SS/HP)

Halfpipe

Slopestyle

Big Air

Women's standings

Parallel overall (PSL/PGS)

Parallel slalom

Parallel giant slalom

Snowboard Cross

Freestyle overall (BA/SS/HP)

Halfpipe

Slopestyle

Big Air

Team

Parallel Team

Snowboard Cross Team

Nations Cup

Overall

References 

FIS Snowboard World Cup
FIS Snowboard World Cup
FIS Snowboard World Cup